Mount Price is the eastern of two peaks, rising to 3,030 m at the north end of the Adams Mountains, Queen Alexandra Range in Antarctica. It was named by the Advisory Committee on Antarctic Names (US-ACAN) for Rayburn Price, United States Antarctic Research Program (USARP) meteorologist at Hallett Station, 1963.

References

Shackleton Coast
Price, Mount
Three-thousanders of Antarctica